Taranis aliena is an extinct species of sea snail, a marine gastropod mollusk in the family Raphitomidae.

Description

Distribution
This extinct marine species was found in Upper Cenozoic strata of Wairoa District, Hawke's Bay, New Zealand

References

 Marwick, J. (1965) Upper Cenozoic Mollusca of Wairoa District, Hawke's Bay. New Zealand Geological Survey Paleontological Bulletin, 39, 1–83.
 Maxwell, P.A. (2009). Cenozoic Mollusca. pp 232–254 in Gordon, D.P. (ed.) New Zealand inventory of biodiversity. Volume one. Kingdom Animalia: Radiata, Lophotrochozoa, Deuterostomia. Canterbury University Press, Christchurch.

External links
 

aliena
Gastropods described in 1965
Gastropods of New Zealand